Brittas may refer to:

Places in the Republic of Ireland
Brittas, County Cork, two separate townlands in the Barony of Ibane and Barryroe
Brittas, County Cork, a townland in the Barony of Duhallow
Brittas, County Dublin, a village and townland in South County Dublin, Barony of Uppercross
Brittas, County Kilkenny a townland in the Barony of Crannagh, County Kilkenny
Brittas, County Laois, a townland in the Barony of Tinnahinch, County Laois
Brittas, County Laois, a townland in the Barony of Portnahinch, County Laois
Brittas, County Limerick, a townland in the Barony of Clanwilliam, County Limerick
Brittas, County Louth, a townland in the Barony of Ferrard, County Louth
Brittas, County Mayo, a townland in the Barony of Kilmaine, County Mayo
Brittas, County Meath, a townland in the Barony of Morgallion, County Meath
Brittas, County Tipperary, three separate townlands in County Tipperary in the Baronies of Eliogarty, Iffa and Offa East and Middlethird
Brittas, County Westmeath, two separate townlands in County Westmeath in the Baronies of Kilkenny West and Moyashel and Magheradernon
Brittas, County Wexford, a townland in the Barony of Forth, County Wexford
Brittas, County Wicklow, three separate townlands in County Wicklow in the Baronies of Lower Talbotstown, Upper Talbotstown and Arklow
Brittas Bay, County Wicklow, a beach on the Irish sea coast

Other
Brittas Castle, principal seat of the Dunne family
Gordon Brittas, a character in The Brittas Empire, a British sitcom
John Brittas (born 1966), Indian journalist

See also
Britta